My Heart's in the Highlands was an album by Jo Stafford, arranged and conducted by Paul Weston, released in 1954 by Columbia Records.  This addition to Stafford's discography is a collection of Scottish love songs.

Track listing

Side one

 "My Heart's in the Highlands"
 "John Anderson, My Jo"
 "Ye Banks and Braes of Bonnie Doon"
 "Moll's Meek, Molly's Sweet"

Side two

 "My Love is Like a Red, Red Rose"
 "Green Grow the Rashes, O"
 "My Jean"
 "The Bonnie Lad That's Far Away"

References

1954 albums
Jo Stafford albums
Columbia Records albums
Albums arranged by Paul Weston
Albums conducted by Paul Weston